The 1948 Boston Braves season was the 78th consecutive season of the Major League Baseball franchise, its 73rd in the National League. It produced the team's second NL pennant of the 20th century, its first since , and its tenth overall league title dating to 1876.

Led by starting pitchers Johnny Sain and Warren Spahn (who combined for 39 victories), and the hitting of Bob Elliott, Jeff Heath, Tommy Holmes and rookie Alvin Dark, the  Braves captured 91 games to finish 6 paces ahead of the second-place St. Louis Cardinals. They also attracted 1,455,439 fans to Braves Field, the third-largest gate in the National League and a high-water mark for the team's stay in Boston.  The 1948 pennant was the fourth National League championship in seven years for Braves' manager Billy Southworth, who had won three NL titles (1942–44, inclusive) and two World Series championships (1942 and 1944) with the Cardinals. Southworth would be posthumously elected to the Baseball Hall of Fame as a manager in 2008.

However, the Braves fell in six games to the Cleveland Indians in the 1948 World Series, and would experience a swift decline in both on-field success and popularity over the next four seasons. Attendance woes—the Braves would draw only 281,278 home fans in —forced the team's relocation to Milwaukee, Wisconsin, in March 1953.

After playing .500 baseball in April and May 1948, the Braves vaulted into first place on the strength of a 39–21 record during June and July. Hampered by second baseman Eddie Stanky's broken ankle and center fielder Jim Russell's season-ending illness, the club slumped slightly in August, going only 14–17 and falling out of the lead August 29. But then it righted itself to win 21 of its final 28 games, regain the top spot September 2, and clinch the NL flag on the 26th. Meanwhile, the city's American League team, the Red Sox, ended their season in a first-place tie with the Indians and lost a playoff game to Cleveland at Fenway Park on October 4; this ruined the prospect of what would have been the only all-Boston World Series, now an impossibility since the Braves left Boston after the 1952 season. (The Tribe were doubtlessly very unpopular in Beantown after defeating both of their teams in the post-season.)

For both the Braves and Red Sox, the 1948 season was the first in which their games were broadcast on television, with telecasts alternating between WBZ-TV and WNAC-TV and the teams sharing the same announcers. The first-ever telecast of a major league game in New England occurred on Tuesday night, June 15, with the Braves defeating the visiting Chicago Cubs 6–3 behind Sain's complete game.

Offseason 
 October 28, 1947: Hoyt Wilhelm was purchased by the Braves from the Mooresville Moores. (Date given is approximate. Exact date is uncertain.)
 November 20, 1947: Hoyt Wilhelm was drafted from the Braves by the New York Giants in the 1947 minor league draft.
 March 6, 1948: Bama Rowell, Ray Sanders, and $40,000 were traded by the Braves to the Brooklyn Dodgers for Eddie Stanky.
 Prior to 1948 season: Carl Sawatski was acquired from the Braves by the Chicago Cubs.

Regular season

Season standings

Record vs. opponents

Roster

Player stats

Batting

Starters by position 
Note: Pos = Position; G = Games played; AB = At bats; H = Hits; Avg. = Batting average; HR = Home runs; RBI = Runs batted in

Other batters 
Note: G = Games played; AB = At bats; H = Hits; Avg. = Batting average; HR = Home runs; RBI = Runs batted in

Pitching

Starting pitchers 
Note: G = Games pitched; IP = Innings pitched; W = Wins; L = Losses; ERA = Earned run average; SO = Strikeouts

Other pitchers 
Note: G = Games pitched; IP = Innings pitched; W = Wins; L = Losses; ERA = Earned run average; SO = Strikeouts

Relief pitchers 
Note: G = Games pitched; W = Wins; L = Losses; SV = Saves; ERA = Earned run average; SO = Strikeouts

1948 World Series

Game 1 
October 6, 1948, at Braves Field in Boston, Massachusetts

Game 2 
October 7, 1948, at Braves Field in Boston, Massachusetts

Game 3 
October 8 at Cleveland Municipal Stadium in Cleveland, Ohio

Game 4 
October 9, 1948, at Cleveland Municipal Stadium in Cleveland, Ohio

Game 5 
October 10, 1948, at Cleveland Municipal Stadium in Cleveland, Ohio

Game 6 
October 11, 1948, at Braves Field in Boston, Massachusetts

Farm system 

LEAGUE CHAMPIONS: Evansville

Notes

References 

1948 Boston Braves season at Baseball Reference

Boston Braves seasons
Boston Braves
Boston Braves
1940s in Boston
National League champion seasons